The Physics House Band are an English band formed in Brighton, England, in 2012. They have released three studio albums.

History
Formed in 2012, the band comprised multi-instrumentalists Sam Organ and Adam Hutchinson and drummer Dave Morgan, who met while studying at University in Brighton, and were initially members of a five-piece band. They initially gained a following from their video for "Titan" on YouTube. The band's debut album, Horizons/Rapture, was released in 2013. Comedian Stewart Lee, in a Sunday Times review of Horizons/Rapture wrote: "This youthful Brighton trio’s debut offers ugly-beautiful instrumental progressive rock that ageing King Crimson fans think no-one can play anymore."

The band's second album, Mercury Fountain, was released in 2017. The title of this album references an Alexander Calder sculpture of the same name that Hutchinson saw in Madrid. The album was described in The Independent as "a cataclysmic, cyclical odyssey that spirals in and out of kaleidoscopic pockets, serene ambience and frenetic, apoplectic wig-outs".

In 2018 Saxophonist/multi-instrumentalist Miles Spilsbury joined the group.

On March 9, 2021 the band released a statement saying Adam Hutchinson had stepped way from the band the previous year.

The band released a third album Incident on 3rd on December 3, 2021.

The group have toured and performed shows with Alt-J, Jaga Jazzist, Deerhoof, LITE, 65daysofstatic, Three Trapped Tigers, Mono, Omar Rodriguez-Lopez.

The band's music has been described as "psychedelic experimental rock", "psych-rock", and "psychedelic, experimental math-rock". Paul Lister, writing for The Guardian, described them as a "perfect storm of rock, prog, psych, cosmic, tech metal and jazz fusion", stating that the band members played "about 33 instruments" between them.

Band members
 Samuel Organ - Guitars, synthesizers
 Dave Morgan - Drums
 Miles Spilsbury - Saxophone, synthesizers

Past band members
 Adam Hutchison - Bass, synthesizers until 2020

Discography 
Studio albums
 Horizons / Rapture (2013, Blood & Biscuits Records)
 Mercury Fountain (2017, Small Pond Recordings)
 Death Sequence (May 2019, Unearthly Vision)
 Incident On 3rd (December 2021, Unearthly Vision)

Remix albums
 Horizons / Rapture: Remixed (2014, Blood & Biscuits Records / KLDSCP Records)

References

External links 
 

Musical groups from Brighton and Hove
English psychedelic rock music groups